Land and Sons is a 1980 Icelandic drama film directed by Ágúst Guðmundsson. The film was selected as the Icelandic entry for the Best Foreign Language Film at the 53rd Academy Awards, but was not accepted as a nominee.

Cast
 Sigurður Sigurjónsson as Einar
 Jón Sigurbjörnsson as Tómas
 Jónas Tryggvason as Ólafur
 Guðný Ragnarsdóttir as Margrét
 Sigríður Hafstað as Móðir Margrétar
 Þorvarður Helgason as Örlygur
 Haukur Þorsteinsson as Mjólkurbílstjóri
 Kristján Skarphéðinsson as Hreppstjóri
 Magnús Ólafsson as Kaupfélagsstjóri

See also
 List of submissions to the 53rd Academy Awards for Best Foreign Language Film
 List of Icelandic submissions for the Academy Award for Best Foreign Language Film

References

External links
 

1980 films
1980 drama films
Films directed by Ágúst Guðmundsson
1980s Icelandic-language films
Icelandic drama films